The Volleyball Federation of Yugoslavia (Odbojkaški Savez Jugoslavije) was a national governing body of volleyball. It was founded in 1946. It organized a men's national team and a women's national team.

The federation was one of the founding members of the Fédération Internationale de Volleyball.

Successors
Volleyball Federation of Bosnia and Herzegovina
Croatian Volleyball Federation
Macedonian Volleyball Federation
Volleyball Federation of Montenegro
Volleyball Federation of Serbia
Volleyball Federation of Slovenia

    
Volleyball organizations
Sports governing bodies in Yugoslavia